Rufus E. (Pete) Straughter (born May 4, 1937) is an American politician. He is a member of the Mississippi House of Representatives from the 51st District, being first elected in 1994. He is a member of the Democratic party.

References

1937 births
Living people
Democratic Party members of the Mississippi House of Representatives
People from Humphreys County, Mississippi
African-American state legislators in Mississippi
21st-century American politicians
21st-century African-American politicians
20th-century African-American people